Tsai Jeong-duen is a judge in the Republic of China. He currently serves as the Vice President of Judicial Yuan since 13 October 2010.

Education
Tsai obtained his bachelor's degree in law from National Chengchi University (NCCU), master's degree in law from National Chung Hsing University and doctoral degree from NCCU.

See also
 Law of the Republic of China

References

1953 births
Living people
20th-century Taiwanese judges
National Chengchi University alumni
National Chung Hsing University alumni
21st-century Taiwanese judges